Opostega xenodoxa is a moth of the family Opostegidae. It was described by Edward Meyrick in 1893. It is known from New South Wales, Australia.

References

Opostegidae
Moths described in 1893